Tower of Strength may refer to:
a phrase taken from the Book of Common Prayer of 1549, and later used in

Richard III (Act V, Scene 3) by William Shakespeare
"Tower of Strength" (Skin song), song on 1994 album Skin by band Skin
 "Tower of Strength" (Gene McDaniels song), 1961 charting single by Gene McDaniels
"Tower of Strength" (The Mission song), 1988 charting single by The Mission
"Tower of Strength" (Frankie Vaughan single), 1961 UK Christmas Number One recording (cover of Gene McDaniels song)